Oyehut is a census-designated place (CDP) in Grays Harbor County, Washington, United States. The population was 85 at the 2010 census. Prior to 2010 it was part of the combined Oyehut-Hogan's Corner CDP.

Geography
Oyehut is located in western Grays Harbor County at the south end of Washington State Route 115. The CDP is bordered to the south by the city of Ocean Shores, to the east by SR 115, to the north by Ocean City State Park, and to the west by the Pacific Ocean.

References

Census-designated places in Grays Harbor County, Washington
Census-designated places in Washington (state)